Guadua angustifolia also known as the Colombian timber bamboo and Colombian giant thorny, is a species of clumping bamboo found from Central to South America.

References

External links
 
 

angustifolia
Taxa named by Carl Sigismund Kunth